The Al-Qaeda insurgency in Yemen is an ongoing armed conflict between the Yemeni government, the United States and their allies, and al-Qaeda-affiliated cells in Yemen. It is a part of the Global War on Terror.

Government crackdown against al-Qaeda cells began in 2001, escalating steadily until 14 January 2010, when Yemen declared open war on al-Qaeda. In addition to battling al-Qaeda across several provinces, Yemen was forced to contend with a Shia insurgency in the north and militant separatists in the south. Fighting with al-Qaeda escalated further during the course of the 2011 Yemeni revolution, with Jihadists seizing most of the Abyan Governorate and declaring it an Emirate. A second wave of violence began in early 2012, with militants claiming territory across the southwest amid heavy combat with government forces.

On 16 September 2014, a full-scale civil war erupted after Houthi fighters stormed Sana'a and ousted interim President Hadi, fracturing the Yemeni government between the UN recognized government of President Hadi and the Houthis' newly formed Supreme Political Council. The full-scale civil war led to a rise of Islamist Groups (Al-Qaeda, ISIS), insurgencies (Houthis), and call for separation of South Yemen.

Background

Prior to hostilities, Yemen had already come under pressure to act against al-Qaeda, since attacks on its two main allies, Saudi Arabia and the United States, were primarily conducted by militants based in Yemen.

Al-Qaeda had also had a long history of operation in Yemen. The bin Laden family originated from Hadhramaut and so Osama bin Laden felt a strong attachment to the country. Bin Laden recruited many volunteers to the Soviet–Afghan War from North Yemen. After the war he made an offer to send al-Qaeda to overthrow the Communist government of South Yemen but Prince Turki bin Faisal turned him down. Bin Laden was upset when Saudi Arabia and the United States soon afterwards accepted a Yemeni unification agreement in which the Yemen Socialist Party leaders would continue to serve in the government. He responded by committing assassinations of YSP leaders which destabilized the country. Yemeni President Ali Abdullah Saleh complained to King Fahd about al-Qaeda's operations, and Prince Nayef bin Abdulaziz rebuked bin Laden and confiscated his Saudi passport. In the 1990s North Yemeni Soviet-Afghan War veterans formed the al-Qaeda-aligned Aden-Abyan Islamic Army.

Previous attacks linked to al-Qaeda in Yemen include the 2000 bombing of the USS Cole, the 2008 American Embassy attack, and several other attacks against foreign tourists.

Yemen had intensified operations against al-Qaeda in late 2009, when a Yemen-based wing of the group claimed to be behind the failed 25 December 2009 attempt to blow up a Detroit-bound U.S. airliner, itself a retaliation against an attack against a training camp in Abyan on 17 December, resulting in the deaths of multiple civilians. News reports have indicated substantial American involvement in support of Yemeni operations against al-Qaeda since late 2009, including training, intelligence sharing, "several dozen troops" from the Joint Special Operations Command, and limited direct involvement in counter-terrorism operations.

Timeline

Early insurgency (1998–2002)

Government crackdown (2009–2010) 
2009: Members of the British Special Air Service and the Special Reconnaissance Regiment deploy to Yemen and Somalia to carry out operations against Islamist militants in both countries, amid concerns of cooperation with insurgents. Operating as part of a counter-terrorism training unit and assisting in missions to kill or capture AQAP leaders, primarily tasked with hunting down the planners of the Cargo planes bomb plot. The SAS liaised with local commandos and provided protection to embassy personnel.
17 December 2009: Yemeni ground forces carry out raids in Sana'a (arresting 13), Arhab (killing 4 and arresting 4), and attack an alleged training camp in Al-Maajala, Abyan, killing 24–50, including 14 women and 21 children. According to ABC News, American cruise missiles were also part of the raids. The U.S. denied they were involved in the strikes, despite evidence to the contrary from Amnesty International.
24 December 2009: U.S. drones or missiles strike an al-Qaeda meeting in Shabwa, killing some 30 individuals. One target of the strike was Anwar al-Awlaki.
4 January 2010: Yemeni security forces kill two alleged militants north of the capital.
6 January 2010: Yemeni forces arrest three suspected al-Qaeda militants who were wounded in a raid, that was carried out by security forces.
13 January 2010: The Yemeni Army launches Operation Blow to the Head in Sa'dah against Sunni al-Qaeda and Shi'a Houthi fighters. Al-Qaeda leader Abdullah al-Mehdar is killed in the fighting.
14 January 2010: A Yemeni air strike kills at least six suspected al-Qaeda fighters in the north of the country, according to Yemeni officials.
17 January 2010: A radical Islamist Somali group claims it had been exchanging some of its fighters with those in Yemen. Yemeni militants were reportedly sending fighters in return. This exchange in fighters showed the close links it had with the country of Yemen, an al-Shabab spokesman said.
20 January 2010: The Yemeni air force bombs the home of a suspected al-Qaeda leader, Ayed al-Shabwani, who the military had claimed was dead a week before this bombing.
21 January 2010: In order to "halt terrorist infiltration," Yemen decides issue visas strictly through embassies, ceasing the practice of issuing visas to foreigners upon arrival in Yemen.
8 February 2010: Al-Qaeda leader Said Ali al-Shihri releases an online audio message calling for jihad in the Arabian Peninsula.

First Battle of Lawdar
Between 19-25 August 2010, the Yemeni army launched a major offensive in the city of Lawdar controlled by Al-Qaeda in the Arabian Peninsula. Several militants including local leaders of Al Qaeda were killed during the clashes. On 25 August 2010, Yemeni authorities claimed to regain control of the southern town of Lawdar, a great part of which was in the grip of suspected Al-Qaeda militants during days of clashes with the army.

Further attacks in Zinjibar
On 25 August 2010, gunmen on motorcycles attacked a military patrol in Yemen's restive south on Wednesday, killing four soldiers and wounding one, a security official said. The official said an early investigation indicated the attackers were members of al-Qaida, which lately appears to have stepped up high-profile attacks in the south of this impoverished country. He did not provide details. The attack occurred in the Abyan provincial capital of Zinjibar and brought to 53 the number of soldiers killed by al-Qaida since May, the official said. He spoke on condition of anonymity because he was not authorized to talk to the media.

Battle of Huta

On 20 September 2010, several militants attacked and took control of the village of Hota in the southern parts of the country, prompting the Army to counter-attack. This happened as the top U.S. counterterrorism advisor John O. Brennan was on a visit to Yemen and discussed cooperation in the fight against Al-Qaeda, according to the White House. Brennan met President Ali Abdullah Saleh and delivered a letter from Obama expressing U.S. support for a "unified, stable, democratic and prosperous Yemen", National Security Council spokesman Mike Hammer said in a statement. "President Saleh and Mr. Brennan discussed cooperation against the continuing threat of Al-Qaeda, and Mr. Brennan conveyed the United States' condolences to the Yemeni people for the loss of Yemeni security officers and citizens killed in recent Al-Qaeda attacks, " Hammer said.

Al-Qaeda militants besieged in the southern Yemeni town of Hota were reportedly using residents as human shields in the second major clash between them and troops in recent weeks. According to officials "al-Qaeda elements are preventing residents from leaving Hota, to use them as human shields".

On 24 September 2010, the government siege of al-Hota ended after security forces took control of the town in the southern province of Shabwa.

Revolution (2011)
8 January 2011: Armed suspected al-Qaeda militants attacked a Yemeni army checkpoint in Lahj killing 4 soldiers a day after 12 soldiers were killed in an ambush in Lawdar.
6 March 2011: Armed suspected Al Qaeda gunmen shoot dead 4 soldiers from the elite Republican Guard as they passed in a truck near Marib.
26 March 2011: al-Qaeda captured the town of Jaar in the southern part of Yemen.
27 March 2011: al-Qaeda militants captured the town of al-Husn, the strategic mountain of Khanfar, and a weapons factory. Fighting in Jaar captured the day prior is being reported.
31 March 2011: Al-Qaeda Emirate in Yemen is declared

Aftermath

Battle of Zinjibar 

On 27 May 2011, about 300 Islamic militants attacked and captured the coastal city of Zinjibar (population 20,000). During the takeover of the town, the militants killed seven soldiers, including a colonel, and one civilian.

In the months that followed the militants entrenched themselves within the city as the Army resorted to aerial bombardment and artillery attacks. The insurgents responded with daily bombings and suicide attacks. By the end of the year, almost 800 had been killed in total, with casualties almost equal on both sides.

On 4 March 2012, militants launched an attack against an Army artillery battalion on the outskirts of Zinjibar, overrunning it and killing 187 soldiers and wounding 135. 32 al-Qaeda fighters were also killed during the fighting. The militants attacked the Army base with booby-trapped vehicles and managed to capture armored vehicles, tanks, weapons and munitions. The military reported 55 soldiers were captured while the militant group claimed up to 73 were in fact taken prisoner. The assault started with a diversionary attack on one end of the base, with the main militant force attacking the other end of the compound. Several car bombs were detonated in front of the gates, after which the attackers entered the base, capturing heavy weapons and turning them against the soldiers. Reinforcements from other nearby military bases came too late due to a sandstorm. It was also revealed that previous military claims of taking back the city were untrue, with the militants still controlling most of Zinjibar and a few surrounding towns, namely Jaar where they paraded the captured soldiers. In the days following the attack, the military conducted airstrikes against militant positions around Zinjibar which they claimed killed 42 al-Qaeda fighters.

The Ansar al-Sharia group that took responsibility for the attack was believed to be just a re-branding of al-Qaeda in the Arabian Peninsula, to make it more appealing to the devout rural population. Three days after the attack, the group let a Red Cross team into Jaar to treat 12 wounded soldiers and demanded a prisoner exchange with the government.

After the beginning of fighting around the city of Lawdar in early April 2011, violence escalated around Zinjibar as well. At least six militants and two Yemeni soldiers were killed in a shootout on 19 April 2012. A major army operation followed in the end of the same month, with hundreds of troops advancing against militant positions in Abyan province. Troops managed to reach the center of Zinjibar after several days of fighting, including an intense six-hour battle towards the end on 25 April 2012. Three militants had been killed on the 23rd, and at least 46 died in the province during the next two days, including 15 near Lowdar. Government casualties were initially not released, while meanwhile leaflets and a video released by Ansar al-Sharia contained threats to kill the 85 captive Yemeni soldiers unless the government withdraws its forces.

Many of the Islamist forces operating in Abyan province refer to themselves as Ansar al-Sharia ("Partisans of Islamic Law").

Post-Saleh (2012–2013)
On 14 January 2012, hundreds of people displaced by months of fighting were allowed to return to their homes in Zinjibar after a temporary deal was reached between insurgent forces and the army units. Locals described "widespread" destruction across the city and several minefields that the army warned them about. According to reports, the militants held the western part of the city, while the east was controlled by government forces. Thousands of people previously held protests demanding an end to the fighting that has forced them to flee their homes in the south, holding several 50 km (31-mile) marches from the port city of Aden to Zinjibar. Estimates of the number of people displaced from the government operations against the militants had risen to nearly 97,000.

Attacks continued during the next weeks, including a suicide bombing on 13 March 2012 near al-Bayda that killed four soldiers and left four others critically injured. After this attack militants posted a video in which they announced the capture of yet another soldier, bringing the total number of prisoners they hold to 74. They demanded an agreement to free imprisoned insurgents in exchange for the soldiers.

On 31 March 2012, a large group of militants attacked an Army checkpoint in Lahij Governorate during the night, sparking a battle that left 20 soldiers and 4 insurgents dead. The attackers fled with heavy weapons and at least two tanks. Government forces later called in airstrikes that successfully destroyed one of the captured tanks, killing its three occupants.

On 12 December 2013, security officials say more than 40 people have been killed in sectarian clashes between Sunni Islamic militants and northern rebel forces belonging to a branch of Shiites in northern Yemen. The officials say the fighting began when ultraconservative Salafis took over a Houthi stronghold in a strategic mountainous area near the border with Saudi Arabia. The two sides battled with artillery fire, mortar shells, and machine guns in the town of al-Fagga.

Second Battle of Lawdar

On 9 April 2012, a large group of militants attacked an Army base near the city of Lawdar and briefly overran it during a battle where locals had to join the military to help drive them out. There were at least 94 people killed in that initial attack, including six civilians, seventy-four insurgents, and fourteen soldiers. This was the third such assault in recent weeks, after two similar attacks in March left at least 130 soldiers dead and more than 70 as prisoners of al-Qaeda affiliated groups.

Government sources raised the casualty figures yet again on 10 April 2012, bringing the total to 124 dead in two days—including 102 militants, 14 soldiers, and at least eight civilians. Local tribal sources confirmed the toll, adding that among the dead insurgents there were at least 12 Somalis and several Saudis. Reinforcements were being brought into the area as Air Force planes began bombing insurgent positions near Lawdar and on the main road towards Zinjibar.

At least 51 deaths were recorded on 11 April 2012, most of them al-Qaeda-linked fighters. These included 42 militants, six soldiers and three local militia members. The government reportedly sent an elite anti-terrorism squad to help in defeating the militants.

As of 13 April 2012 the battle was still raging around the city with clashes spreading to nearby Mudiyah, the only other town apart from Lawdar that insurgents do not control in the province. Mortar shelling was reported for the second consecutive day by local citizens, with at least 17 civilians injured and the main power station reportedly on fire. After the government sent an additional 200 members of an anti-terrorism unit militants pulled out of the city and back towards the nearby villages of Um Sorra and Wadhia, leaving a few snipers behind. The official death toll on 13 April 2012 stood at 37, including 31 militants, five members of a tribal civilian militia, and a child that was shot by an unidentified sniper. Authorities reported the city to be relatively quiet on Saturday, with only sporadic gunfire breaking the silence. On Sunday a suicide bomber killed two tribal militia members at a checkpoint in al-Hodn, just outside Lawdar. Six militants and two locals were killed in other clashes around the town, specifically in an area called al-Minyasa.

After a few quiet days, fighting resumed on 18 April 2012, with militants shelling the city and government forces ordering airstrikes in retaliation. Two children were killed and at least five houses were destroyed during the mortar attacks, while six militants were confirmed dead in the airstrikes. The previous day a suicide car bomber had attacked an army checkpoint on the outskirts of Lawdar, killing five Yemeni soldiers and injuring four more. On 19 April 2012 at least seven militants were killed after clashes with an Army unit based in Lawdar. On 21 April 2012, Yemeni airplanes bombed militant positions in nearby Jebel Yasuf and al-Minyasa, killing at least 13 fighters. On 25 April 2012 at least six militants were killed after their convoy was ambushed by local militia members. Fifteen insurgents were killed two days earlier after a similar incident. Fighting around the city on 30 April 2012 killed 12 militants, a soldier and a tribal militia member.

Meanwhile, insurgents continued their attacks across the country, as an army checkpoint near Aden was assaulted by a group of armed men in pickup trucks. In the ensuing gunbattle at least eight attackers and four Yemeni soldier were killed, while three al-Qaida fighters and one security force member were wounded. Additionally, militants kidnapped a senior intelligence officer and two soldiers in the town of Radda south of the capital Sana'a. The town was briefly lost to the terrorist groups in January, before being taken back by government forces a few weeks later. By 16 May 2012, Yemen troops backed pro-government tribal militias captured the Yasouf mountain, a strategic force above the city, after heavy fighting. After doing so, it was announced that the militants had fled Lawder.

2012 Sana'a bombing

On 21 May 2012, a soldier detonated a suicide bomb in a crowd of military personnel at the beginning of a rehearsal for a Unity Day parade in Sana'a. The bomb killed 96 and wounded more than 200, making it the deadliest attack in Yemen's history. Al-Qaeda in the Arabian Peninsula claimed responsibility and described it as "revenge" for the continued offensive by the Central Security Organization.

2013
In May 2013, Al-Qaeda attackers blew up Yemen's main oil pipeline, halting the flow of exported crude oil. Oil exportion represents 70% of the state budget.

In late May 2013, Long War Journal reported that AQAP had been active in Hadramout Governorate over the past several months and that on the 24 May 2013, they took seized control of villages near the Yemeni port city of Mukalla in what an apparent bid to take over swathes of Hadramout Governorate. The Interior Ministry said the seizure was a "terrorist plot to proclaim an Islamic emirate in the Ghayl Bawazir area;” residents of Ghayl Bawazir said that the jihadists had taken advantage of an absence of security forces from the area to deploy in strength and had already distributed leaflets declaring their rule.

The Long War Journal reported that on 6 December 2013, AQAP militants assaulted the Ministry of Defense building in Sana’a in what it claimed was an effort to strike at the US drone program 52 people were killed including 7 foreign nationals (2 German and 2 Vietnamese doctors and 1 Indian and 2 Filipino nurses) and 11 AQAP fighters.

2014
In 2014, AQAP claimed responsibility for over 150 attacks in Yemen, using tactics such as IEDs, suicide bombings, and small-arms attacks; targeting both Houthis and Yemeni military and government institutions, including military bases, the Presidential palace in Sana’a, military checkpoints, and vehicles, and the police academy in Sana’a, killing over 75 Yemeni government or military personnel.

By early January 2014, AQAP had regrouped in Hadramout Governorate and other provinces after losing control of major cities in Abyan and Shabwa provinces to government forces starting in late spring 2012. Hadramout was the ancestral home of Osama bin Laden, and the province has become an AQAP stronghold over the past several years. On 16 January 2014, al-Qaeda militants killed 10 Yemeni soldiers in three simultaneous attacks on army positions in Al Bayda Governorate. Eight extremists were also killed in the assaults, which prompted further clashes with the army. Al-Qaeda assailants carried out simultaneous attacks against three military positions in Rada in Bayda, an extremist stronghold, the official said.

On 24 March 2014, al-Qaeda militants attacked a military checkpoint near Reida in the province of Hadramawt, located 135 km (85 miles) east of the provincial capital Mukalla. Twenty soldiers were killed as a result.

On 29 April 2014, the BBC reported that the Yemeni military, with tribal leaders and locals, had launched an offensive against AQAP militants in Abyan and Shabwa provinces, Saba News Agency described the "extensive." The areas targeted included Abyan's al-Mahfad district and Azzan in Shabwa, security sources told the Associated Press news agency that 8 suspected AQAP militants and three soldiers were killed in the offensive, and another report said 15 soldiers were killed in Shabwa province in a suspected ambush by AQAP fighters. Yemeni officials earlier in the month said that as many as 55 militants died in a government air campaign over Shabwa, Abyan and the nearby province of Bayda.

In July 2014, AQAP declared plans to establish an Islamic emirate in Hadramout province ordering men and women to obey its strict interpretation of Islamic law.

On 17 August 2014, six suspected al-Qaeda militants and three Yemeni soldiers died in clashes in the southeastern Hadramawt province, which became the scene of many recent attacks on the army. On 31 August 2014, at least 11 Yemeni soldiers have been killed and 17 others injured by suspected al-Qaeda militants in three separate attacks in the southern part of the country.

Yemeni Civil War (2015)

On 16 September 2014, a full-scale civil war erupted after Houthi fighters stormed Sana'a and ousted interim President Hadi, fracturing the Yemeni government between the UN recognized government of President Hadi and the Houthis newly formed and led Supreme Political Council. The full-scale civil war led to the rise of AQAP who used the chaos to their advantage and gained influence in Yemeni territory.

On 25 November 2014, Yemeni special forces supported by U.S. special forces rescued 8 hostages, killed 7 militants and a member of the Yemeni forces wounded in a rescue mission.

On the 31 December 2014, a suicide bomber detonated explosives outside a cultural center during celebrations of the Prophet Muhammed's birthday, killing 23 people.

On 7 January 2015, a large car bomb detonated outside a Police Academy in Sanaa, Yemen. The attack killed at least 38 and wounded over 90.

In mid-January 2015, the Islamic State of Iraq and the Levant declared it had established a branch inside Yemen the previous month, and that they were recruiting fighters, bringing them into competition against AQAP.

The United States and the United Kingdom withdrew their forces in March 2015 as a result of the escalation of the civil war.

Mukalla

Capture of Mukalla

Al-Qaeda scored a major victory on 2 April 2015, taking advantage of chaos created by a full-scale conflict in southwestern Yemen and foreign airstrikes elsewhere in the country to capture the city of Mukalla from government forces. Al-Qaeda militants freed some 300 inmates from a jail in the city. The New York Times reported: "Al Qaeda's strongest opponents, the Houthis and Yemen's American-trained counterterrorism troops, have been busy fending off attacks from the Saudi military."

Liberation of Mukalla

On 24 April 2016 the United Arab Emirates Armed Forces entered Mukalla and commenced operations against AQAP, liberating Mukalla in 36 hours. The operation was hailed by US Defence Scetary James Mattis as a model of fighting terrorism.

Mukalla was then used as a base of operations by the UAE Armed Forces and Joint Special Operations Command, allowing the CIA to target AQAP strongest cells in Yemen.

2016
In February 2016 Al-Qaeda forces and Saudi-led coalition forces were both seen fighting Houthi rebels in the same battle.

In April 2016, It was reported that MI6 teams with members of the Special Reconnaissance Regiment seconded to them had been operating in Yemen; training Yemen forces fighting AQAP and identifying targets for drone strikes.

On 6 May 2016, it was reported that a small number of U.S. military personnel had been deployed to Yemen two weeks previously to support Arab forces fighting AQAP in the country. They have been supporting Yemeni and Emirati forces fighting in Mukalla by planning operations and providing other assistance. The U.S. has also staged over 2,000 to 4,500 U.S. Marines of the 13th MEU offshore in a flotilla that includes the USS Boxer, supported by the USS Gravely and the USS Gonzalez.

2017
On 29 January 2017, The New York Times reported that SEALs from SEAL Team Six carried out a surprise dawn attack on an AQAP headquarters in Bayda Province that a senior American official said counterterrorism officials had deemed valuable enough to warrant a ground operation rather than an airstrike. The raid lasted a little less than an hour, one American commando was killed and three others were injured, an estimated 14 Qaeda fighters were killed in the raid, which according to the statement, led to "the capture of information that will likely provide insight into the planning of future terror plots." A senior American official said a MV-22 Osprey that was sent to evacuate the wounded troops in the raid crash-landed nearby, leaving two more service members injured and was unable to fly after the landing therefore it was intentionally destroyed by American airstrikes.

In April 2017, the leader of Al-Qaeda in the Arabian Peninsula (AQAP), Qassim Al-Raymi, issued a statement that his terrorist organization will keep fighting the "Houthi Shia" in Yemen. Al-Raymi also said he is ready to make truce with Yemen President Hadi government and to set for negotiations but with conditions. Both al-Qaeda and ISIS are fighting the Houthi rebels in Yemen.

On 6 August 2017, The New York Times reported that, about 2,000 Yemeni troops, supported by dozens of advisers from the United Arab Emirates and a handful of US special forces personnel providing intelligence and planning assistance, launched an offensive against AQAP militants occupying parts of Shabwa Province the preceding week. In addition the US is providing air-to-air refueling and aerial reconnaissance for forces involved in the operation.

2018
On 22 July 2018, a suspected U.S. drone strike kills four alleged al-Qaeda militants in Ma'rib.

In August 2018, Al Jazeera reported that a Saudi Arabian-led coalition "battling Houthi rebels secured secret deals with al-Qaeda in Yemen and recruited hundreds of the group's fighters... an investigation by The Associated Press found the coalition has been paying some al-Qaeda commanders to leave key cities and towns while letting others retreat with weapons, equipment, and wads of looted cash. Key figures in the deal-making said the United States was aware of the arrangements and held off on drone attacks against the armed group, which was created by Osama bin Laden in 1988." UAE Brigadier General Musallam Al Rashidi in an interview responded to the accusations by saying that Al Qaeda cannot be reasoned with, explaining that many of his soldiers died fighting them. The UAE Armed Forces released a statement that accusations of allowing AQAP to leave with cash contradicts their primary objective of hindering AQAP of its financial strength. The United States Pentagon responded to the accusations by stating they are false. Colonel Robert Manning, spokesperson of the Pentagon, called the news source "patently false". The governor of Hadramut Faraj al-Bahsani also dismissed the accusations that Al Qaeda has joined with the coalition rank, stating that if they did there would be sleeper cells and that he would be "the first one to be killed". According to The Independent, AQAP activity on social media as well as the number of terror attacks conducted by them has decreased since the Emirati intervention.

Operation Decisive Sword
On 26 February 2018, the United Arab Emirates Armed Forces launched a counter-terrorism operation in Shabwa governorate against Al-Qaeda in the Arabian Peninsula (AQAP). The UAE Armed Forces carried out the operation alongside the Shabwani Elite Forces. The UAE-led operation was launched two days after ISIS in Yemen killed 14 people and wounded 40 while attempting to storm a counter-terrorism headquarter in Aden, southern Yemen. Using Mukalla as a base to retake Shabwa's al-Said district (Wadi Yeshbum). AQAP had used this site—the former area controlled by the influential AQAP leader Anwar al-Awlaki before he was killed in 2011— to recruit and train extremists. The operation was successful in securing control over several areas in the Shabwa governorate.

Operation Sweeping Torrent

Two weeks after the last offensive, the United Arab Armed Forces began another operation in Abyan province called Operation Sweeping Torrent alongside forces from the Security Belt on 7 March 2018. They used Aden as a base to secure Wadi Hamara and al-Mahfad in Abyan governorate. Abyan is seen as important because it is a crossroad linking the Emirati-influenced regions of Aden and Hadramawt while also providing access to Bayda, the central governorate most infiltrated by extremists. Abu Mohesen Basabreen, an Al-Qaeda leader, was killed while fighting with the Security Belt Forces (SBF). According to the UAE, heavy losses have been incurred already by AQAP.

Operation Crushing Revenge
UAE-backed Security Belt Forces continued to carry out counterterrorism campaigns targeting AQAP enclaves in Abyan, Shabwa and Hadramawt. In particular, in Abyan's Mudiya district, Security Belt forces launched 'Operation Crushing Revenge' in December 2018.

The military operation comes three weeks after the assassination in Aden of Colonel Fahed Gharama, who commanded Security Belt Forces in Lawder district in Abyan province. The operation involved carrying out operations against AQAP forces in Shabwa's as-Said district and western Hadramawt. Earlier in December, AQAP cells broke into the Al Fathan area coming from Al Bayda province. According to the Security Belt Force military source, the operation was launched once intel regarding AQAP presence was received.

Two Al Qaeda commanders, Abu Al Darda Al Baydhani and Abu Qusai Al Adeni, were reportedly killed in the clashes. The fighting took place in the mountainous area in Al Fathan in Moudiya district. The campaign was intended to track down Al Qaeda militia who were not killed during the operations in Abyan and find the AQAP cells that infiltrated the area. According to the Security Belt spokesman, dozens of Al Qaeda members were killed. The Security Belt Force involved in the operation numbered 10,000 soldiers. AQAP fired mortars from hilltop positions. Security Belt Forces imposed a siege around the area for three days and kept counter shelling using artillery until they had full control over the area.

According to the military source, despite the ongoing military operations by Security Belt Forces in the province, AQAP militants continue to hold pockets of territory in northwest Moudiya district.

2019
On 7 April 2019, the United Arab Emirates Armed Forces alongside the Security Belt forces launched a large anti-terror military campaign to clear a number of mountains and valleys located in the Mahfad town, a key previous hideout of AQAP militants. UAE-backed Yemeni security forces succeeded in seizing arms and ammunition, including hand grenades, improvised explosive devices and communication equipment inside the mountainous hideouts of the al-Qaida militants who fled to other areas as a result of the campaign.

On 30 August 2019, warplanes of the United Arab Emirates Armed Forces launched airstrikes on AQAP in southern Yemen. A number of moving vehicles carrying AQAP members were precisely targeted. AQAP local commanders named as Abu Baraa Baidhani and Al-Khader Judeeb were within the armed convoy struck by UAE airstrikes near the eastern outskirts of Aden.

On September 2019, as a result of UAE draw down from Yemen and increased infighting between Houthis and Hadi forces, AQAP took the advantage and deployed across Abyan and Shabwa in southern Yemen. According to a local Yemeni official, absence of the Shabwani elite security units that were trained and equipped by the United Arab Emirates (UAE) enabled AQAP to gain a foothold in the turbulent province Shabwa again.

2022
In August 2022, a sign that the once-vaunted Al Qaeda Yemen group was greatly weakened was shown when no Al Qaeda in Arabian Peninsula leaders were deemed potential candidates to succeed Ayman al-Zawahiri as leader of Al Qaeda following al-Zawahiri's death.

U.S. drone and cruise missile attacks
The U.S. claimed it first used targeted killing in November 2002, with the cooperation and approval of the government of Yemen.
A CIA-controlled high-altitude Predator drone fired a Hellfire missile at an SUV in the Yemeni desert containing Qaed Salim Sinan al-Harethi, a Yemeni suspected senior al-Qaeda lieutenant believed to have been the mastermind behind the October 2000 USS Cole bombing that killed 17 Americans. He was on a list of targets whose capture or death had been called for by President George W. Bush. In addition to al-Harethi, five other occupants of the SUV were killed, all of whom were suspected al-Qaeda members, and one of whom (Kamal Derwish) was an American.

In May 2010, an errant U.S. drone attack targeting al Qaeda members in Wadi Abida, Yemen, killed five people, including Jaber al-Shabwani, deputy governor of Maarib province.

According to The Times, in 2010 the United States, in cooperation with Yemeni officials, launched four cruise missiles at suspected terrorist targets in Yemen. According to the Times, Yemen asked the United States to suspend the strikes after one of the missiles killed a pro-Yemeni tribal leader, Sheikh Jaber al-Shabwani, the deputy governor of Marib province, resulting in his tribe turning against the Yemeni government. The Times also stated that U.S. special forces troops were on the ground in Yemen helping to hunt al-Qaeda operatives.

On 3 June 2011, American manned jets or drones attacked and killed Abu Ali al-Harithi, a midlevel al-Qaeda operative, as well as several other militant suspects in a strike in southern Yemen. Four civilians were also reportedly killed in the strike. The strike was reportedly coordinated by American special forces and CIA operatives based in Sana. According to the Associated Press, in 2011 the U.S. government began building an airbase in the middle east from which the CIA and the U.S. military plan to operate drones over Yemen. On 30 September 2011, Anwar al-Awlaki was targeted by a US drone strike which successfully killed him, Samir Khan and a few other militants while they were all in the same car driving to get breakfast.

References

External links
Al-Qaeda in Yemen: Renaissance of Terror
After Thwarted Bomb Plot, US Military Operations in Yemen Could Intensify - video report by Democracy Now!

Rebellions in Yemen
Wars involving Yemen
United States–Yemen relations
National security in Yemen
1990s in Yemen
2000s in Yemen
2011 in Yemen
Conflicts in 2000
Conflicts in 2001
Conflicts in 2002
Conflicts in 2003
Conflicts in 2004
Conflicts in 2005
Conflicts in 2006
Conflicts in 2009
Conflicts in 2008
Conflicts in 2007
Conflicts in 2010
Insurgencies in Asia